The Dent de Corjon (1,967 m) is a mountain of the Swiss Prealps, located west of Rossinière in the canton of Vaud. It is the culminating point of the small range lying between the valley of L'Hongrin and the Sarine, north of the Lac de l'Hongrin.

References

External links
 Dent de Corjon on Hikr

Mountains of Switzerland
Mountains of the Alps
Mountains of the canton of Vaud
One-thousanders of Switzerland